James Madison Drake (March 25, 1837 to November 28, 1913) was an American newspaper publisher who fought in the American Civil War. Drake received the country's highest award for bravery during combat, the Medal of Honor, for his action during the Battle of Port Walthall Junction in Virginia on May 6, 1864. He was honored with the award on March 3, 1873.

Biography
Drake was born in the Washington Valley near Washington Rock in Somerset County, New Jersey on March 25, 1837.

In 1853, he began publishing the Trenton, New Jersey Mercer Standard, which continued until 1854; in 1857, he launched the Evening News, and in 1860, he launched Wide Awake. Later that year he served on the city council as an alderman, remaining in that position until July 1861, at which point he joined the 9th New Jersey Infantry. After the war, he served in the New Jersey National Guard, rising to the rank of Colonel. He also worked as a newspaper publisher in Elizabeth, New Jersey, where he managed the production of the Daily Monitor from 1868 to 1881, the Elizabeth Sunday Leader from 1882 to 1887, and the Elizabeth Daily Leader from 1887 to 1900.

Drake died on November 28, 1913 and his remains are interred at the Evergreen Cemetery in Hillside, New Jersey.

Medal of Honor citation

See also

List of American Civil War Medal of Honor recipients: A–F

References

External links
 

1837 births
1913 deaths
People of New Jersey in the American Civil War
Union Army officers
United States Army Medal of Honor recipients
American Civil War recipients of the Medal of Honor
Burials at Evergreen Cemetery (Hillside, New Jersey)
People from Somerset County, New Jersey
People from Elizabeth, New Jersey
19th-century American newspaper founders